Thomas David "Tommy" Roe (born May 9, 1942) is an American singer-songwriter who had several chart topping songs in multiple countries during the 1960s including Sheila and Sweet Pea. He recorded 13 studio albums and 55 singles from 1960 to 1987.

Albums

Studio albums

Compilation albums

Singles

References

Pop music discographies